|}

The Doncaster Cup is a Group 2 flat horse race in Great Britain open to horses aged three years or older. It is run at Doncaster over a distance of 2 miles 1 furlong and 197 yards (3,600 metres), and it is scheduled to take place each year in September.

History 
The event was established in 1766, and it was originally called the Doncaster Gold Cup. It pre-dates Doncaster's St. Leger Stakes by ten years, and is the venue's oldest surviving race. It was initially held at Cantley Common, and moved to its present location in 1776.

During the early part of its history the race was contested over 4 miles. It was shortened to 2 miles and 5 furlongs in 1825, and reduced to 2 miles and 2 furlongs in 1891. It was cut by another furlong in 1908, and restored to its previous length in 1927.

The present system of race grading was introduced in 1971, and for a period the Doncaster Cup was classed at Group 3 level. It was promoted to Group 2 in 2003.

The Doncaster Cup is one of Britain's leading events for "stayers" – horses which specialise in racing over long distances. It is the final leg of the Stayers' Triple Crown, preceded by the Gold Cup and the Goodwood Cup.  The Doncaster Cup is the only British race where the winner has ballot-exempt entry to the Melbourne Cup.

The race is currently held on the third day of Doncaster's four-day St. Leger Festival.

Records
Most successful horse (4 wins):
 Beeswing – 1837, 1840, 1841, 1842

Leading jockey (8 wins):
 Joe Mercer – Nick La Rocca (1953, dead-heat), Grey of Falloden (1964), The Accuser (1968), Biskrah (1972), Sea Anchor (1976), Buckskin (1978), Le Moss (1979, 1980)
 (note: the jockeys of some of the early winners are unknown)

Leading trainer (7 wins):
 Cecil Boyd-Rochfort – Alcazar (1934), Black Devil (1935), Osborne (1954), Atlas (1956), Agreement (1958, 1959), Raise You Ten (1963)
 Henry Cecil – Buckskin (1978), Le Moss (1979, 1980), Ardross (1982), Kneller (1988), Great Marquess (1991), Canon Can (1997)
 (note: the trainers of some of the early winners are unknown)

Winners since 1801

Earlier winners

 1766: Charlotte
 1767: Meaburn
 1768: Laura
 1769: Tantrum
 1770: Liberty
 1771: Mark
 1772: Mark
 1773: Forester
 1774: Juniper
 1775: Juniper
 1776: Tuberose
 1777: Pilot
 1778: Phocion
 1779: Magnum Bonum
 1780: Duchess
 1781: Crookshanks
 1782: Crookshanks
 1783: Faith
 1784: Phoenomenon
 1785: Alexander
 1786: Fairy
 1787: Stargazer
 1788: Bustler
 1789: Tot
 1790: Abba Thulle
 1791: Young Traveller
 1792: Overton
 1793: Oberon
 1794: Beningbrough
 1795: Hambletonian
 1796: Hambletonian
 1797: Stamford
 1798: Stamford
 1799: Cockfighter
 1800: Dion

* The 1901 and 1953 races were dead-heats and have joint winners.

See also
 Horse racing in Great Britain
 List of British flat horse races
 Recurring sporting events established in 1766  – this race is included under its original title, Doncaster Gold Cup.

References

 Paris-Turf: 
 Racing Post:
 galopp-sieger.de – Doncaster Cup.
 ihfaonline.org – International Federation of Horseracing Authorities – Doncaster Cup (2019).
 pedigreequery.com – Doncaster Cup – Doncaster.
 tbheritage.com – Doncaster Cup.
 

Flat races in Great Britain
Doncaster Racecourse
Open long distance horse races
British Champions Series
1766 establishments in England